Tung Fang Design University is a university located in Hunei District, Kaohsiung, Taiwan.

The university offers undergraduate programs in Visual communication design, Industrial design, Fashion design, Digital Media design, and Creative design management.

History
TF was originally established in January 1966 as Private Tung Fang Junior College of Industry and Arts. In July 1969, the junior college was renamed to Tung Fang Junior College of Industry. In October 1990, the junior college was again renamed to Tung Fang Junior College of Industry and Commerce. In August 2002, the junior college was upgraded to Tung Fang Institute of Technology and in 2010 to Tung Fang Design Institute. In 2020, the university had an enrollment rate of less than 60%.

Faculties
 School of Arts and Design
 School of Engineering
 School of Business and Management

Notable alumni
 Sung Chi-li, cult leader and geomancer

Transportation
The university is accessible West from Dahu Station of Taiwan Railways.

See also
 List of universities in Taiwan

References

External links
 

1966 establishments in Taiwan
Educational institutions established in 1966
Hunei District
Universities and colleges in Kaohsiung